Marijke Merckens (3 February 1940 – 9 February 2023) was a Dutch actress and singer.

Filmography

Film
A Woman Like Eve (1979)
 (1981)
Honneponnetje (1988)

Television
Leute wie du und ich (1982)
 (1982)
Sesamstraat
 (1987)

 (1993–1994)

References

1940 births
2023 deaths
Dutch film actresses
Dutch television actresses
Dutch women singers
People from Magelang